TJ Tatran Oravské Veselé is a Slovak football team, based in the town of Oravské Veselé.

Current squad

Colours
Club colours are green and yellow.

External links
Official club website 
  
Club profile at Futbalnet.sk 
Club profile at Soccerway

References

Football clubs in Slovakia
Association football clubs established in 1950